Caldy is a small, affluent village on the Wirral Peninsula, England, south-east of West Kirby. It is part of the West Kirby & Thurstaston Ward of the Metropolitan Borough of Wirral and is in the parliamentary constituency of Wirral West. At the time of the 2001 Census, Caldy had 1,290 inhabitants, of a total ward population of 12,869.

History
It was first mentioned in the Domesday Book in 1086 as being owned by Hugh of Mere. Nearby is a large area of National Trust land called Caldy Hill. Many of the houses and walls in the village centre are built from the local red sandstone.

Caldy was a township in the West Kirby Parish of the Wirral Hundred. The population was 92 in 1801, 142 in 1851, 202 in 1901 and 607 in 1951. Until the twentieth century, Caldy was effectively a farming and agricultural village. However, The Caldy Manor Estates Company divided the land into smaller building plots, and from this one of the north of England's most exclusive residential villages emerged. 
Between 1894 and 1933, Caldy was part of Wirral Rural District, then subsequently Wirral Urban District. On 1 April 1974, local government reorganisation in England and Wales resulted in most of Wirral, including Caldy, transfer from the county of Cheshire to Merseyside.

Caldy railway station was on the Hooton to West Kirby branch of the Chester and Birkenhead Railway. The station closed in 1954 and the trackbed is now the 'Wirral Way' of Wirral Country Park.

Geography
Caldy is on the western side of the Wirral Peninsula, on the eastern side of the Dee Estuary.

Education
Calday Grange Grammar School is between Caldy and West Kirby, with West Kirby Grammar School and Hilbre High School nearby.

Sport
Caldy Rugby Football Club, a rugby union club, play at Paton Field in nearby Thurstaston. The team currently compete in 
the Championship, the second tier of the rugby union pyramid in England.

Caldy Cricket Club play at Paton Field in nearby Thurstaston in the summer months. They currently field four Saturday teams in the Liverpool and District Cricket Competition.

Transport

Road

Caldy is at the junction of the B5140 and B5141 roads, and is near to the A540.

Rail
The nearest railway station to Caldy is West Kirby, on the Wirral Line of the Merseyrail network after Caldy railway station was closed in 1954.

Notable residents
Caldy is noted for having many well-known residents, particularly those connected to professional football, such as  Robbie Fowler and Rafael Benítez.
Rafael Benitez in a press conference referred to "John the milkman" in the Wirral while launching a cryptic attack on previous Liverpool club owner Tom Hicks and managing director Christian Purslow.

The poet and novelist Malcolm Lowry lived in Caldy as a child, as did his brother the England rugby player Wilfrid Lowry, and the science fiction author Olaf Stapledon lived in Caldy from 1940 until his death in 1950.

Sir Cyril Clarke KBE, FRCP, FRCOG, (Hon) FRC Path, FRS, physician, geneticist and lepidopterist, lived in Caldy for many years until his death in November 2000.

See also
Listed buildings in Hoylake

References

Bibliography

External links

 Caldy Cricket Club Website
 Merseytravel

Towns and villages in the Metropolitan Borough of Wirral